Rhabdophis angeli, also known commonly as Angel's keelback, is a species of keelback snake in the family Colubridae. The species is endemic to Vietnam.

Etymology
The specific name, angeli, is in honor of French herpetologist Fernand Angel.

Geographic range
R. angeli is found in northern Vietnam, in Thái Nguyên Province and Vĩnh Phúc Province.

Habitat
The preferred natural habitat of R. angeli is forest.

Description

Reproduction
R. angeli is oviparous.

References

Further reading
Bourret R (1934). "Notes herpétologiques sur l'Indochine Française II: Sur quelques serpents des montagnes du Tonkin ". Bulletin Générale de l'Instruction Publique, Hanoi 1934: 149–157. (Natrix angelii, new species). (in French).
Nguyen VS, Ho CT, Nguyen TQ (2009). Herpetofauna of Vietnam. Frankfurt am Main: Chimaira / Serpents Tale.768 pp. .
Orlov NL, Murphy RW, Papenfuss TJ (2000). "List of snakes of Tam-Dao mountain ridge (Tonkin, Vietnam)". Russian Journal of Herpetology 7 (1): 69–80. (Rhabdophis angelii).

Rhabdophis
Snakes of Southeast Asia
Reptiles of Vietnam
Endemic fauna of Vietnam
Reptiles described in 1934
Taxa named by René Léon Bourret